Kheyrabad (also Romanized as Kheyrābād; also known as Chāh-e Ḩājj ʿAbdāl Ghafūr Rajab ʿAlīzād) is a village in Dasht-e Taybad Rural District, Miyan Velayat District, Taybad County, Razavi Khorasan Province, Iran. At the 2006 census, its population was 2,728, in 551 families.

References 

Populated places in Taybad County